Carol J. Greenhouse (born January 4, 1950) is an American anthropologist. She is currently professor emerita in the Department of Anthropology at Princeton University, where she previously served as Arthur W. Marks Professor of Anthropology and Chair. She is also the former president of the American Ethnological Society, former editor of its peer-review journal, American Ethnologist, and former president of the Law and Society Association.

In 2012, Greenhouse was named a fellow of the American Academy of Arts and Sciences. She is a member of the American Philosophical Society (since 2011). She is a sister of Linda Greenhouse.

Education and career 
Greenhouse received her Bachelor of Arts in Anthropology from Radcliffe College in 1971 and her Ph.D. in Anthropology from Harvard University in 1976. At Harvard, she studied under legal anthropologist Klaus-Friedrich Koch and Mesoamericanist anthropologist Evon Z. Vogt. Following the completion of her Ph.D., Greenhouse joined the faculty at Cornell University. She remained at Cornell until 1991, when she took a position in the Department of Anthropology at Indiana University. Since 2001, she has been a professor in the Department of Anthropology at Princeton University.

Books 
 Praying for Justice: Faith, Order, and Community in an American Town. Cornell University Press, 1986.
 Law and Community in Three American Towns. Cornell University Press, 1994.
 A Moment's Notice: Time Politics Across Cultures. Cornell University Press, 1996.
 Democracy and Ethnography: Constructing Identities in Multicultural Liberal States (Editor). SUNY Press, 1998.
 Ethnography in Unstable Places: Everyday Lives in Contexts of Dramatic Political Change (Editor). Duke University Press, 2002.
 Ethnographies of Neoliberalism (Editor). University of Pennsylvania Press,  2009.
 The Paradox of Relevance: Ethnography and Citizenship in the United States. University of Pennsylvania Press, 2011.

References 

Cornell University faculty
Princeton University faculty
Radcliffe College alumni
1950 births
Living people
Members of the American Philosophical Society
Fellows of the American Academy of Arts and Sciences